Gvetadze is a surname. Notable people with the surname include: 

Nino Gvetadze, Georgian pianist
Razhden Gvetadze (1897–1952), Georgian Soviet writer and translator
Sopio Gvetadze (born 1983), Georgian chess  grandmaster

Georgian-language surnames